Health is the state of complete physical, mental, and social well-being and a positive concept emphasizing social and personal resources, as well as physical capacities. This article lists major topics related to personal health.

0–9

A 
Abortion
– Accident
– Activities of daily living
– Acupuncture
– Adolescent medicine
– Adult daycare center
– Advance health care directive
– Aerobic exercise
– Age-adjusted life expectancy
– Ageless
– Aging and memory
– Aging
– Alcoholism
– Allergy
– Alternative medicine
– Amputation
– Anaerobic exercise
– Anaesthesia
– Anatomical pathology
– Anatomical terms of motion - Anatomy
– Andrology
– Animal-assisted therapy
– Antibiotic resistance
– Appetite
– Assisted reproductive technology
– Athletic training
– Audiology
– Autoimmune disease
– Auxology

B 
Bacterium
– Baldness
– Basic life support
– Binge eating
– Biochemical pathology
– Biological standard of living
– Biomedical research
– Biomedical technology
– Bipolar disorder
– Birth attendant
– Birth control
– Blood diseases
– Blood test
– Body composition
– Body Mass Index (BMI)
– Body shaping
– Body treatment
– Brain death

C 
Cancer
– Cell replacement therapy
– Chemotherapy
– Child birth
– Chinese medicine
– Chiropractic
– Clinical death
– Cognitive enhancement
– Cognitive therapy
– Collaborative therapy
– Community-based rehabilitation
– Community health
– Complementary and alternative medicine
– Complementary medicine
– Convalescence
– Cryosurgery

D 
Death
– Deficiency disease
– Dental hygiene
– Dentistry
– Dermatology
– Determinants of health
– Detoxification
– Developmental disability
– Diabetes
– Diagnosis
– Diet (nutrition)
– Diet and obesity
– Dietary fiber
– Dietary mineral
– Dietary supplement
– Dietetics
– Dieting
– Digestion
– Digestive system
– Digestive tract
– Disability
– Disease registry
– Disease
– Doctor-patient relationship
– Dysarthria
– Dyslexia
- Diphtheria

E 
Ecological health
– Energy medicine
– Environmental health
– Enzyme
– Epidemic
– Ethnicity and health
– Evidence-based medicine
– Evidence-based practice
– Evolutionary medicine
– Eugenics
– Exercise equipment
– Exercise physiology
– Exercise

F 
Fad diet
– Faith healing
– Family centered care
– Family planning
– Famine
– Fast food
– Female infertility
– Fertility
– Fetal alcohol syndrome
– Folk medicine
– Food additive
– Food allergy
– Food and cooking hygiene
– Food groups
– Food pyramid (nutrition)
– Food quality
– Food science
– Food supplements
– Food technology
– Food
– Forensic pathology
– Free clinic
– Functional diversity (disability)

G 
Gene therapy
– General fitness training
– General surgery
– Genetic counseling
– Genetic engineering
– Genetically modified organism
– Genetics
– Genital integrity
– Genitourinary medicine
– Genome project
– Genome
– Genomics
– Geriatric sexology
– Geriatrics
– Gerontology
– Global Health – Gynaecology

H 
Haematology
– Hand surgery
– Healer (alternative medicine)
– Healing
– Health applications and clinical studies of meditation
– Health care delivery
– Health care industry
– Health care system
– Health care
– Health claims on food labels
– Health disparities
– Health economics
– Health education
– Health geography
– Health information on Wikipedia – Health literacy
– Health observatory
– Health profession
– Health promotion
– Health science
– Health
– Healthcare inequality
– Healthcare
– Healthy diet
– Healthy eating
– History of medicine
– Holistic health
– Home birth
– Home remedy
– Homeopathy
– Homeostasis
– Hormone
– Hospice
– Hospital accreditation
– Hospital
– Human anatomy
– Human cloning
– Human enhancement
– Hygiene

I 
Illness
– Illnesses related to poor nutrition
– Immortality
– Immunity (medical)
– Immunology
– Infectious diseases
– Infertility
– Inflammation
– Injury
– Internal medicine

J

K

L 
Life
– Life expectancy
– Life extension
– Longevity

M 
Macronutrient
– Male infertility
– Malnutrition
– Manipulative therapy
– Manual therapy
– Maternal health
– Maximum life span
– Medical cannabis
– Medical case management
– Medical devices
– Medical herbalism
– Medical history
– Medical imaging
– Medical model
– Medical physics
– Medical privacy
– Medical school
– Medical sociology
– Medical technology
– Medical tourism
– Medication
– Medicine
– Meditation – Megadose
– Megavitamin therapy
– Men's health
– Mental disorder
– Mental health
– Mental hygiene
– Mental retardation
– Metabolism
– Meteoropathy
– Microbiology
– Micronutrient
– Midwifery
– Mind-body intervention
– Miscarriage
– Mortality rate
– Multivitamin
– Mutation

N 
Nanomedicine
– Nanotechnology
– Natalism
– Naturopathic medicine
– Neonatal infection
– Neuroimmunology
– Neurology
– Neuroscience
– Neurosurgery
– Noise health effects
– Non-infectious disease
– Nuclear medicine
– Nurse
– Nursing school
– Nursing
– Nutrient density
– Nutrient
– Nutrigenomics
– Nutrition and pregnancy
– Nutrition
– Nutritional supplement
– Nutritionist

O 
Obesity
– Obstetrics and gynaecology
– Obstetrics
– Occupational hygiene
– Occupational medicine
– Occupational safety and health
– Occupational therapy
– Old age
– Oncology
– Online pharmacy
– Ophthalmology
– Optometry
– Oral hygiene
– Organ transplant
– Organic food
– Organism
– Orthopaedics
– Osteopathy
– Over-the-counter drug
– Overweight

P 
Palliative care
– Paramedic
– Pathogen
– Pathology
– Pediatrics
– Perioperative medicine
– Pharmaceutical care
– Pharmaceutical policy
– Pharmaceutical sciences
– Pharmacology
– Pharmacy
– Physical education
– Physical examination
– Physical exercise
– Physical fitness
– Physical therapy
– Physician
– Plastic surgery
– Population health
– Positive mental attitude
– Posture and occupational health
– Pre-conception counseling
– Pregnancy
– Pregnant patients' rights
– Prenatal care
– Prescription drugs
– Preventive medicine
– Primary care
– Primary health care
– Psychiatry
– Psychoanalysis
– Psychoeducation
– Psychoneuroimmunology
– Psychotherapy
– Public health

Q 
Quality of Life (Healthcare)

R 
Radiology
– Rare disease
– Rejuvenation (aging)
– Reproductive endocrinology and infertility
– Reproductive health
– Reproductive medicine
– Right to Health – Rheumatology
– Rural health
– Rural health clinic

S 
STD testing
– Safe sex
– Sanitation
– Saturated fat
– Self care
– Self-healing
– Self-medication
– Senility
– Sex and illness
– Sex education
– Sexual dysfunction
– Sexual health clinic
– Sexual health
– Sexuality and disability
– Sexuality education
– Sleep deprivation
– Sleep hygiene
– Sleep
– Smoking cessation
– Social determinants of health
– Social medicine
– Special needs
– Sports medicine
– Sports nutrition
– Stem cell treatments
– Stress (medicine)
– Stress management
– Supported living
– Surgery
– Survivability
– Symptom

T 
Therapy dog
– Toxicity
– Toxicology
– Toxin
– Traditional Chinese medicine
– Traditional Korean medicine
– Traditional medicine
– Trans fat
– Trauma surgery
- Tetanus

U 
Universal design

V 
Vaccine
– Vegetarianism
– Virus
– Vitamin
– Vulvovaginal health

W 
Weight loss
– Wellness (alternative medicine)
– Wellness
– Witch-doctor
– Women's health
– Workplace health surveillance
– Workplace wellness
– World Health Organization
- Whooping Cough

X 
X-ray

Y 

Yoga

Z

See also 
 Lists of health topics
 Topic outline of health
 Topic outline of health science
 Topic outline of dentistry
 Topic outline of exercise
 Topic outline of nutrition

Health topics
Health